New Grove is an extinct town in western Wright County, in the Ozarks of southern Missouri, United States. The GNIS classifies it as a populated place.

The community is located on the north bank of the Woods Fork of the Gasconade River along Missouri Route F, approximately 2.5 miles south of Missouri Route 38.

A post office called New Grove was established in 1905, and remained in operation until 1915. The community once had New Grove Schoolhouse, now defunct.

References

Ghost towns in Missouri
Former populated places in Wright County, Missouri